Liverpool is a 2012 Canadian comedy crime film. Written and directed by Manon Briand, the film stars Stéphanie Lapointe as Émilie, a coat check clerk at a Montreal nightclub who decides to return a coat left behind one night by a woman who took a drug overdose in the club, only to find herself embroiled in the city's criminal underground. Her only ally in the quest is Thomas (Charles-Alexandre Dubé), a regular customer of the club and a potential new love interest for Émilie.

Liverpool was Briand's first film since 2002's Chaos and Desire.

References

External links 

2012 films
Canadian crime comedy films
2010s crime comedy films
Films set in Montreal
Films directed by Manon Briand
2012 comedy films
French-language Canadian films
2010s Canadian films